Gelali-ye Jadid (also Romanized as Gelālī-ye Jadīd; also known as Gelālī-ye Tāzehābād) is a village in Baladarband Rural District, in the Central District of Kermanshah County, Kermanshah Province, Iran. At the 2006 census, its population was 43, in 10 families.

References 

Populated places in Kermanshah County